The 40th anniversary of the Libyan Revolution was a ruby jubilee anniversary in the Great Socialist People's Libyan Arab Jamahiriya celebrated on 1 September 2009 in honor of the 1969 Libyan coup d'état.

Background

The coup, known officially as the al-Fateh Revolution or the 1 September Revolution, was carried out by group of Libyan Army officers led by Colonel Muammar Gaddafi, known as the Free Officers Movement. The goal of this group was to overthrow King Idris I. On 1 September, 70 officers and enlisted soldiers who mostly came from the Corps of Signals launched a seizure of the government in Benghazi and, within two hours, gained control of the entire national government. One of the coup plotters first actions were to abolish the Kingdom of Libya and proclaim the Libyan Arab Republic. Institutions that were later created such as the Libyan People's Court were used to purge any remnants of the former regime. The coup, staged amidst the Arab Cold War, was the result of a continuous rise in ideologies such as Nasserism, Arab nationalism and Arab socialism throughout the Islamic and particularly the Arab world. The coup transformed the country into a military dictatorship under the Libyan Revolutionary Command Council, and later a socialist state or Jamahiriya.

Events

Military parade
A military parade of troops of the African Union and the Libyan Armed Forces took place on Green Square on 1 September. This marked the first day of celebrations. Troops from foreign countries took part in the parade. Units that represented their country included: 154th Preobrazhensky Independent Commandant's Regiment (Russia), 26-member contingent of the Serbian Armed Forces (Serbia). Musical accompaniment was provided by the Armed Forces Band, who performed the national anthem, Allahu Akbar. Music was also provided by the bands of foreign states, including the Band of the 154th Preobrazhensky Regiment as well as the bands participating in the World Military Music Festival. For the foreign section of the parade, the bands performed Russian military marches, particularly the Preobrazhensky Regiment March, Hero and Farewell of Slavianka.

Military tattoo
The World Military Music Festival took place on 2 September as a military tattoo that saw the participation of military bands and cultural groups from 16 nations and 5 continents. It was presided by Gaddafi's son Mutassim in his position as National Security Advisor of Libya.

Each individual band and group had their own short performance before being brought together for massed finale. Performances included pipe band songs, the national anthem, and the massed bands leaving to a Russian tune. The performance took place on Green Square in front of an audience of invited guests and senior military officials and thousands of members of an incredibly appreciative general public. The bands present also gave an additional impromptu street performance on the square.

Morocco was set to participate in the event, however withdrew after it learned that representatives of the Sahrawi Arab Democratic Republic and the Polisario Front would be attending.

Controversially, Somali pirate leader Mohamed "Afweyne" Abdi Hassan was invited to and attended the celebrations. Gaddafi frequently defended and politically supported the Somali pirates.

Attendees

 Sri Lankan President Mahinda Rajapaksa
 Yemeni President Ali Abdullah Saleh
 President of the Dominican Republic Leonel Fernandez
 Serbian President Boris Tadić
 Algerian President Abdelaziz Bouteflika
 Tunisian President Zine El Abidine Ben Ali
 Argentine President Cristina Fernandez de Kirchner
 Venezuelan President Hugo Chavez
 Sheikh Hamad bin Khalifa Al Thani of Qatar
 Sheikh Sabah Al-Ahmad Al-Jaber Al-Sabah of Kuwait
 King Abdullah II of Jordan
 Sudanesse President Omar Al-Bashir
 Malian President Amadou Toumani Touré
 Gambian President Yahya Jammeh 
 Chadian President Idriss Deby
 Zambian President Rupiah Banda 
 Nigerien President Mamadou Tandja
 Congolese President Denis Sassou Nguesso
 Burkinabe President Blaise Compaore
 President Francois Bozize of the Central African Republic
 President Jakaya Kikwete of Tanzania
 President Faure Gnassingbé of Togo
 President Yayi Boni of Benin
 President Ahmed Abdullah Sambi of the Comoros Islands
 President Mohamed Ould Abdel Aziz of Mauritania
 President Pedro Pires of Cape Verde
 President Fradique Menezes of Sao Tome and Principe
 Burundian President Pierre Nkurunziza
 Prime Minister Meles Zenawi
 Filipino President Gloria Macapagal Arroyo
 Palestinian President Mahmoud Abbas
 Bosnian President Željko Komšić
 President George Abela of Malta
 President Filip Vujanović of Montenegro
 Acting President of Guinea-Bissau Raimundo Pereira
 President Mohamed Abdelaziz of the Sahrawi Arab Democratic Republic
 President of the Council of State of Oman Yahya Ben Mahfoudh Al-Mundiri
 Sheikh Mansour Ben Zayyid Al Nahyan, Minister of Presidential Affairs of the United Arab Emirates
 National Security Advisor to the President of Belarus Viktor Lukashenko
 Vice President of Gabon Didjob Divungi Di Ndinge
 Vice President of Ghana John Dramani Mahama
 Vice President of Nigeria Goodluck Jonathan accompanied by former president Olusegun Obasanjo
 Vice President of Iraq Tariq Al-Hashimi
 Prime Minister of Namibia Nahas Angula
 Prime Minister of Morocco Abbas Al-Fasi
 Prime Minister of Pakistan Yousaf Raza Gillani
 Prime Minister of Lesotho Pakalitha Mosisli
 Prime Minister of Equatorial Guinea Francisco Pascual Obama Asue
 Prime Minister of Somalia Omar Sharmarke
 Prime Minister of Singapore Goh Chok Tong
 Field Marshal Mohamed Hussein Tantawi, Minister of Defense of Egypt
 Vice President of Liberia Joseph Boakai
 Chairman of the State Duma of Russia Boris Gryzlov

See also
60th anniversary of the People's Republic of China
25th anniversary of Hamas
History of Libya under Muammar Gaddafi

References

External links
Full footage of the marchpast

Military parades
2009 in Libya
Historical events in Libya
Anniversaries
Military tattoos
September 2009 events in Africa